Dale Barracks is a British Army base at Moston near Chester, England. The military installation, which has accommodation and training facilities, was established shortly before the Second World War as a depot for the Cheshire Regiment. It is now a garrison for the 1st Battalion Royal Welsh. Although originally scheduled to close in 2023, the British Army announced the barracks will be retained till at least 2029.

History
The barracks are situated in the grounds of Moston Hall, a house built in 1789 for Richard Massey. The house was acquired by the Swetenham family who sold it to the Lockett family in 1918. During the First World War, the house was used as a military hospital.

The rest of the site was occupied by a house known as The Dale which was built in the 1880s and was bought by the War Office in 1938. The Dale became the depot of the Cheshire Regiment who arrived from Chester Castle in 1939. During Second World War the Machine Gun Training Centre was established there and after the War it became a Primary Training Centre for infantry training. Between 1956 and 1987 it was part of Western Command and home to 165 Western Command Provost Company (RMP); part of the Dale was used for civilian purposes as a secure asylum before it was returned to military use as the officer's mess for the barracks of the 1st Battalion the King's Regiment.

The 1st Battalion Royal Welsh moved out of the barracks in April 2014 and the 2nd Battalion Mercian Regiment arrived in July 2014. The 2nd Battalion Mercian Regiment itself left in Summer 2018 and was replaced by 1st Battalion The Duke of Lancaster's Regiment which arrived in November 2018.

In November 2016 the Ministry of Defence announced that the site would close in 2023. This was later extended to not be before 2027, and once more to 2029.

References

Barracks in England
Installations of the British Army